Gyraulus chinensis is a species of small freshwater snail, an aquatic pulmonate gastropod mollusk in the family Planorbidae, the ram's horn snails.

Distribution 
This species is native to Asia.

The non-indigenous distribution for this species includes:
 Czech Republic as a "hothouse alien"
 Great Britain, as a "hothouse alien"
 Netherlands

References

chin
Gastropods of Asia
Invertebrates of China
Gastropods described in 1848